Luciana Duranti is an archival theorist and professor of archival science and diplomatics at the School of Library, Archival and Information Studies, University of British Columbia in Vancouver, Canada. She is a noted expert on diplomatics and electronic records. Since 1998, she has been the director of the electronic records research project, InterPARES (International Research on Permanent Authentic Records in Electronic Systems). She has disclosed the concept of the archival bond originally initiated by Italian archivist Giorgio Cencetti in 1937.

Education 

 Honorary Doctor of Science, Mid Sweden University, 2019
 BA, French Language, Ecole Internationale de Langue et Civilization Française, 1979
 Diploma di Archivistica (Master’s equivalent), Scuola dell’Archivio di Stato di Roma, 1979
 Ph D, Archivista-Paleografo, Scuola Speciale per Archivisti e Bibliotecari, Università di Roma, 1975
 Dottoressa in Lettere (Master's equivalent, Arts), Università di Roma, 1973

Affiliations 
She has served both the Association of Canadian Archivists and the Society of American Archivists in many capacities. She served as president of the Society of American Archivists from 1998 to 1999, and as president of the Association of Canadian Archivists from 2017 to 2018. She is the Principal Investigator for many investigations, including the Records in the Cloud Project.

Duranti has also served as co-chair for the Steering Committee on Canada's Archives.

Awards 

 Fellow, Association of Canadian Archivists, 2014
 Emmett Leahy Award, 2006
 Fellow, Society of American Archivists, 1998

Selected bibliography 
Duranti has published several works in the area of archival diplomatics and archival theory. She has presented her theories and research at conferences and symposiums around the world.

References

Canadian archivists
Female archivists
Presidents of the Society of American Archivists
Living people
Presidents of the Association of Canadian Archivists
1950 births